Shoot (stylized SHOOT) is a trade magazine for the advertising industry that was established in 1990 as BackStage/Shoot, providing news and information about advertising agencies, executives, and creative advertising professionals. It also issues awards each year recognizing various elements of advertising, such as a "New Directors Showcase", and "Best Work You May Never See".

History
The magazine was established in December 1960 under the title Back Stage, in a newspaper format covering theatre and commercial production. The owners were Ira Eaker and Allen Zwerdling. In the late 1980s, they sold the paper to British Phonographic Industry and the newspaper was split into two in the summer of 1990. On July 6, 1990, the portion known as Back Stage Shoot was spun off into a full, standalone publication, BackStage/Shoot; while the original Backstage continued on independently as well. The concept was to have the original Backstage publication concentrate on actors, performing artists, and theatre, while Shoot would continue to "serve the news and information needs of creative and production decision-makers at ad agencies, and executives & artisans in the production industry". To emphasize the change, the official Back Stage tagline, "The complete service weekly for the communications and entertainment industry" was switched to "The Performing Arts Weekly." In 1994, BackStage/Shoot was renamed simply SHOOT.

In 2005, the primary Back Stage tagline changed from "The Performing Arts Weekly" to "The Actor's Resource", and sister publication SHOOT (and ShootOnline.com) was sold to DCA Business Media LLC. The SHOOTonline website was launched that year, along with an electronic version of the publication.

References

External links 
 

Magazines established in 1990
Monthly magazines published in the United States
English-language magazines
Professional and trade magazines
Magazines published in Connecticut